The 2014/15 FIS Nordic Combined World Cup was the 32nd world cup season, a combination of ski jumping and cross-country skiing organized by FIS. It started on 29 November 2014 in Ruka, Finland and ended on 14 March 2015 in Oslo, Norway.

Calendar

Men

Team

Standings

Overall 

Standings after 17 events.

Nations Cup 

Standings after 22 events.

Prize money 

Standings after 22 events.

Points
The table shows the number of points won in the 2014–15 Nordic Combined World Cup.

Achievements

First World Cup career victory
 , 29, in his 10th season – the WC 5 in Schonach; first podium was 2008–09 in Seefeld
 , 23, in his 5th season – the WC 14 in Val di Fiemme; first podium was 2011–12 in Seefeld

First World Cup podium
 , 17, in his 1st season – no. 3 in the WC 8 in Seefeld

Victories in this World Cup (in brackets victory for all time)
 , 7 (23) first places
 , 2 (24) first places
 , 2 (7) first places
 , 1 (5) first place
 , 1 (7) first place
 , 1 (26) first place
 , 1 (1) first place
 , 1 (5) first place
 , 1 (1) first place

Retirements

Following are notable Nordic combined skiers who announced their retirement:

References

External links
FIS Nordic Combined World Cup 2014/2015 
Nordic Combined at eurosport.com 
Nordic Combined at lequipe.fr 

2014 in Nordic combined
2015 in Nordic combined
FIS Nordic Combined World Cup